To See You is an album by the American artist Harry Connick Jr., released in 1997. It is an album of love songs, recorded with a symphony orchestra.

"The inspiration for this was a flight attendant, really," Connick says. He added, "She asked if I had any romantic records, and I thought maybe it was time to do a romantic album."

Connick toured the United States and Europe with a full symphony orchestra backing him and his piano in each city. As part of his tour, he played at the Nobel Peace Prize Concert in Oslo, Norway, with his final concert of that tour in Paris being recorded for a St. Valentine's Day special on PBS in 1998.

Track listing
All songs are written, arranged and orchestrated by Harry Connick Jr.

Musicians 
Harry Connick Jr – vocals, Piano
Reginald Veal – Double bass
Charles Gould – Tenor Saxophone
Arthur "Bam Bam" Latin – drums
Symphony orchestra

Charts
To See You made the first position in the Jazz charts in 1997, and was number 53 on the Billboard 200.

Certifications

References

External links
 Music video "Learn to Love"
 Music video "Let's Just Kiss"

1997 albums
Harry Connick Jr. albums